Egon Vogel (1908–1993) was a German stage, television and film actor. A character actor he amassed over a hundred credits during his career, some of them in minor parts.

Selected filmography

Film
 Boccaccio (1936)
 The Deruga Case (1938)
 Nanon (1938)
 Robert Koch (1939)
 Bachelor's Paradise (1939)
 D III 88 (1939)
 The Gasman (1941)
 Love Premiere (1943)
 Romance in a Minor Key (1943)
 Marriage of Affection (1944)
 The Woman of My Dreams (1944)
 Die Feuerzangenbowle (1944)
 The Millionaire (1947)
 The Guilt of Doctor Homma (1951)
 Three Days of Fear (1952)
 When The Village Music Plays on Sunday Nights (1953)
 Clivia (1954)
 The Great Test (1954)
 The Abduction of the Sabine Women (1954)
 Teenage Wolfpack (1956)
 The Singing Ringing Tree (1957)
 Taiga (1958)
 The Scarlet Baroness (1959)
 The Last Pedestrian (1960)
 Agatha, Stop That Murdering! (1960)
 Robert and Bertram (1961)
 Life Begins at Eight (1962)
 Stop Train 349 (1963)
 Zwei blaue Vergissmeinnicht (1963)

Television
 Jedermannstraße 11 (1962–65)
 Meine Schwiegersöhne und ich (1970)

References

Bibliography 
 Giesen, Rolf.  Nazi Propaganda Films: A History and Filmography. McFarland, 2003.

External links 
 

1908 births
1993 deaths
Male actors from Berlin
German male television actors
German male film actors
German male stage actors